The braille alphabet used to write Hungarian is based on the international norm for the 26 basic letters of the Latin script. However, the letters for q and z have been replaced, to increase the symmetry of the accented letters of the Hungarian alphabet, which are largely innovative to Hungarian braille.

Alphabet
The Hungarian alphabet is:
A 	Á 	B 	C 	Cs 	D 	Dz 	Dzs 	E 	É 	F 	G 	Gy 	H 	I 	Í 	J 	K 	L 	Ly 	M 	N 	Ny 	O 	Ó 	Ö 	Ő 	P 	(Q) 	R 	S 	Sz 	T 	Ty 	U 	Ú 	Ü 	Ű 	V 	(W) 	(X) 	(Y) 	Z 	Zs

The letters that conform to traditional braille are:

The accented vowel letters are derived from their base letters through stretching or reflection as follows. The traditional letter for q (which is not part of the basic Hungarian alphabet) has been reassigned to ö, and an unused pattern has been assigned to ü:

This creates the following symmetrical pattern for the umlauted vowels:

(Ä is not part of the basic Hungarian alphabet.)

The consonant digraphs are derived from their base letters as follows. The traditional letter for z has been replaced, and is used for a parenthesis. As with the accented vowels, the majority of digraphs are created through reflection:

This creates the following pattern among the sibilants:

Punctuation
Unlike English or French Braille, Hungarian Braille has separate opening and closing symbols for both parentheses and quotation marks.

Mathematics and computer notation

Roman Numerals
the roman numerals use the capital letters of i, v, x, l, c, m

Formatting

References

French-ordered braille alphabets
Hungarian language